Humble is a surname. Notable people with the surname include:

 Ben Humble (1903–1977), Scottish author
 Bill Humble (1911–1992), British aviator
 David Humble (born 1967), retired Canadian badminton player
 Derek Humble (1931–1971), English jazz saxophonist
 Gwen Humble (born 1953), American actress
 Jack Humble (1862–1931), English football player
 Jim Humble, originator and promoter of Miracle Mineral Supplement which is falsely claimed to cure various diseases
 Joan Humble (born 1951), British Labour Party MP
 John Samuel Humble (born 1956), "Wearside Jack", the Yorkshire Ripper hoaxer
 Kate Humble (born 1968), British television presenter
 Robert Alfred Humble (1864–1929), British priest
 Rod Humble (born 1964), executive producer of video game company Electronic Arts
 Susan Humble (born 1978), British ice skater
 Tom Humble (born 1988), Australian Rugby League player
 Weldon Humble (1921–1998), American footballer
 William Humble (1846–1924), English clergyman